The Leland C. and Mary M. Pillsbury Institute for Hospitality Entrepreneurship is an institute at Cornell University located in Ithaca, NY within the School of Hotel Administration. Through the engagement of leading industry leaders and faculty, the institute educates and provides students with a wide realm of activities to expand their entrepreneurship knowledge. The most up-to-date information on the institute can be found on the press release  page of the website.

Goals 
Focusing on advancing students’ entrepreneurship knowledge and mastery, the institutes holds a variety of entrepreneurship focused events including: 
 Entrepreneur in Residence Office Hours  
 Business Consultations  
 Hospitality Business Plan Competition 
 Meet and Repeat Speed Networking  
 “Slice of Insight” Pizza Socials and Networking

With the goal to supporting students on their entrepreneurial journeys, the institute strives to connect the academic and the practical. Through the institute, several entrepreneurship courses have been created in support of the entrepreneurship concentration at the School of Hotel Administration.

References

Cornell University